N. R. Raghunanthan is an Indian film score and soundtrack composer. He has scored music for Tamil films.

NR R debuted as a music director in 2010 with Thenmerku Paruvakaatru directed by Seenu Ramasamy which met with critical acclaim and went on to win three National Film Awards at the 58th National Film Awards. His second film was Krishnaveni Panjaalai (2012). Meanwhile he had also composed SR Prabhakaran's Sundarapandiyan and Seenu Ramasamy's Neerparavai in the same year, while the former was a commercial success, the latter was critically well received. He also worked for music director G. V. Prakash Kumar's debutant productional movie Madha Yaanai Koottam.

Discography

Film score and soundtracks

Upcoming

Television
Abhiyum Naanum (Sun TV)

References

Tamil musicians
Tamil film score composers
Musicians from Chennai
Missing middle or first names
Living people
1975 births